Our Lady of Lourdes College Foundation, also referred to by its acronym OLLCF is a private coeducational basic and higher education institution located in Daet, Camarines Norte, Philippines. It was founded in 1977

History
In 1960, a practicing surgeon put up a small medical clinic at Daet, Camarines Norte. Initially the clinic attended to varied cases. Barely two years, after its establishment, Our Lady of Lourdes Hospital expanded to 25 bed capacity. In 1965, it further expanded its bed capacity to 40 and in 1977 into a 100 bed capacity hospital.

Dr. Abundio Palencia, saw the need of opening a school of Midwifery which he envisioned would help produce the manpower resources urgently needed by various health agencies.

Nineteen seventy seven (1977) saw the birth of the Our Lady of Lourdes College Foundation School of Midwifery with an initial enrolment of eighty (80) and a faculty force of ten (10).

The school of midwifery made a name for the school by producing board topnotchers through the years: 69% School Passing Average (S.P.A) in 1988; 79.7% S.P.A., 62% National Passing Average (N.P.A), in 1992; 88% S.P.A in 1993.

Our Lady of Lourdes Foundation embarked on the offering of other para-medical courses in 1989, namely: Bachelor of Science in Nursing, Bachelor of Arts in Psychology and Certificate in Health-Aide.

The year 1989 was a milestone in the life of OLLCF. The three- storey concrete school building was put up on a four-hectare lot at Vinzons Avenue 600 meters away from Our Lady of Lourdes Hospital, the original school site.

By 1991 the whole school transferred to the new site. Now with more than enough classrooms and campus space, Administration was further challenged to open more courses.

Nineteen ninety two marked the opening of more courses namely: B.S. Medical Technology, B.S. Physical Therapy (5 years), B.S. Radiologic Technology, Associate in Radiologic Technology, B.S. Computer Science, B.S. Commerce, B.S. Secondary Education, B.S. Elementary Education, B.S. Tourism, B.S. Secretarial Administration, Associate in Computer Science, Computer Secretarial and in 1993, the High School Department was born with General Science and Computer Oriented Classes (I-IV).

In June 1993, the first batch of Nursing Graduates passed the National Board Exam with a School passing average of 73% (the national passing averaged is 63%) and in December 1993, the second batch of graduates made it again with a school passing average of 89.9% while the national passing average was 64%.

In 1994, the College of Midwifery made it again to the 13th Board Topnotcher, with S.P.A. of 72% while the N.P.A. is 53%.

The passing average of the School of Midwifery in the 1995 Board Examination, first batch was 93%. The school produced a second Placer. The College of Nursing produced a thirteenth placer in the June 1995 Board Examination.

In 1995, Bachelor of Science in Criminology was offered to provide opportunities to the youth of Camarines Norte who are aspiring to be a part of the country's peacemaking process.

Two years after, the construction of a new building to accommodate both the pre-school and elementary departments was started. When the construction was finally completed in 1998, the institution pioneered the opening of a pre-school Montessori department. The department offers socialized tuition fees to accommodate those who want to avail of quality Montessori education but cannot afford its cost.

The first batch of criminology graduates took the board exams in August 1999 and ranked First Place throughout the Bicol Region in the 15-25 Examinees category.

School year 1999-2000 marked the opening of the Elementary Department. A graduate school in consortium with the Philippines Women's University was also opened. The department offered one Doctoral and four master's degrees.

The construction of the first ever private Gymnasium was started in 2002. After its completion, it not only catered to the needs of the institution but was opened for public use as well.

In 2004, Our Lady of Lourdes College Foundation was able to forge stronger ties with the University of the Philippines by becoming the testing center for the graduate and certificate programs of the University of the Philippines Open University. In the same year, CHED granted the institution the permit to operate Bachelor of Science in Marine Transportation and Bachelor of Science on Marine Engineering Programs. To attain international recognition especially by the International Maritime Organization, OLLCF applied for and was granted ISO 9001:2000 certification in January 2005.

In line with its physical plant development program, the institution continued to expand its land area which has reached 12 hectares in 2006. This provided for ample space where the basic Education building was constructed and where the academic square is being developed.

Academics

College
OLLCF has nine colleges, each having its own structure consisting of a dean, administrative staff, and a teaching faculty.

College of Arts and Sciences
 Bachelor of Science in Psychology
 Bachelor of Arts major in Psychology and Economics
 Associate in Communication
College of Applied Medical Sciences
 Bachelor of Science in Physical Therapy
 Bachelor of Science in Radiologic Technology
College of Business Administration
 Bachelor of Science in Business Administration Major in Finance
 Bachelor of Science in Business Administration Major in Management
College of Computer and Engineering Studies
 Bachelor of Science in Computer Engineering
 Bachelor of Science in Computer Science
 Bachelor of Science in Electronic Engineering 
 Bachelor of Science in Information Technology
 Certificate in Computer Technician
 Certificate in Computer Programming
College of Criminal Justice Education
 Bachelor of Science in Criminology
College of Education
 Bachelor of Science in Secondary Education
 Bachelor of Science in Elementary Education
College of Tourism and Hospitality Management
 Bachelor of Science in Hotel and Restaurant Management
College of Maritime Studies
 Bachelor of Science in Marine Engineering
 Bachelor of Science in Marine Transportation
 Certificate in Welding Technology
College of Nursing
 Bachelor of Science in Nursing
 Certificate in Midwifery
 Certificate in Health Care Services
College of Medical Technology
 Bachelor of Science in Medical Technology

References

Universities and colleges in Camarines Norte.